The tall ship Elissa is a three-masted barque.  She is based in Galveston, Texas, and is one of the oldest ships sailing today. Launched in 1877, she is now a museum ship at the Texas Seaport Museum.  She was designated a National Historic Landmark in 1990. The Texas Legislature designated Elissa the official tall ship of Texas in 2005.

History

Elissa was built in Aberdeen, Scotland as a merchant vessel in a time when steamships were overtaking sailing ships. She was launched on October 27, 1877. The vessel was named for the niece of Henry Fowler Watt, Elissas first owner, though according to his descendants the ship was named for the Queen of Carthage, Elissa (more commonly called Dido), Aeneas' tragic lover in the epic poem The Aeneid.

Elissa also sailed under Norwegian and Swedish flags. In Norway she was known as the Fjeld of Tønsberg and her master was Captain Herman Andersen. In Sweden her name was Gustav of Gothenburg. In 1918, she was converted into a two-masted brigantine and an engine was installed. She was sold to Finland in 1930 (owned by Gustaf Erikson to 1942) and reconverted into a schooner. In 1959, she was sold to Greece, and successively sailed under the names Christophoros, in 1967 as Achaeos, and in 1969 as Pioneer. In 1970, she was rescued from destruction in Piraeus after being purchased for the San Francisco Maritime Museum. However, she languished in a salvage yard in Piraeus until she was purchased for $40,000, in 1975, by the Galveston Historical Foundation, her current owners. In 1979, after a year in Greece having repairs done to her hull, Elissa was first towed to Gibraltar. There, she was prepared for an ocean tow by Captain Jim Currie of the New Orleans surveyors J.K. Tynan International. The restoration process continued until she was ready for tow on June 7, 1979.

Elissa has an iron hull, and the pin rail and bright work is made of teak. Her masts are Douglas fir from Oregon, and her 19 sails were made in Maine.  She has survived numerous modifications including installation of an engine, and the incremental removal of all her rigging and masts.

Elissa made her first voyage as a restored sailing ship in 1985, traveling to Corpus Christi, Texas. In Freeport the crew was joined by seventh grader Jerry Diegel and Betty Rusk, his history and English teacher, after Diegel won an essay contest on the history of the Elissa.  A year later, she sailed to New York City to take part in the Statue of Liberty's centennial celebrations. When she's not sailing, Elissa is moored at the Texas Seaport Museum in Galveston. Public tours are available year-round-provided she is not out sailing. The ship is sailed and maintained by qualified volunteers from around the nation.

In July 2011, the U.S. Coast Guard declared Elissa to be "not seaworthy." The Coast Guard inspection in 2011 revealed a corroded hull. The tall ship is inspected twice every five years, said John Schaumburg, museum assistant director. The 2011 inspection uncovered the worst corrosion since the tall ship was rebuilt in 1982, he said. Texas Seaport Museum raised the $3 million that paid for hull replacement and other long-overdue maintenance projects, finishing in January 2013. The museum also  replaced the 22,000 board feet of Douglas fir decking and building new quarterdeck furniture out of high quality teak. Elissa returned to sailing once again in March 2014. She ran a series of daily sails for a period of two weeks out of her home port of Galveston.

Elissa remains one of the world's oldest sailing hulls still in operation. The oldest is the coasting schooner , launched in 1871 in Christmas Cove, Maine. She still sails as part of the windjammer fleet out of Camden, Maine.

Honors
National Register of Historic Places - first object granted this status while outside United States territory
National Historic Landmark
Named state Tall Ship by act of legislature in 2005

See also
List of National Historic Landmarks in Texas
National Register of Historic Places listings in Galveston County, Texas

References

 .

External links

Elissa InfoPage
Elissa Handbook of Texas Online

Barques
Museum ships in Texas
Individual sailing vessels
Culture of Galveston, Texas
Tall ships of the United States
Sailing ships of the United States
National Historic Landmarks in Texas
Ships on the National Register of Historic Places in Texas
National Register of Historic Places in Galveston County, Texas
Museums in Galveston, Texas
1877 ships
Sailing ships of Scotland
Ships built in Aberdeen
1877 in Scotland
Windjammers